Lee Konitz Nonet is an album by American jazz saxophonist Lee Konitz recorded in 1977 and released on the Chiaroscuro label.

Critical reception

Scott Yanow on Allmusic said "the results are frequently superb".

Track listing 
All compositions by Lee Konitz except where noted.

 "Fanfare" – 0:40
 "Chi-Chi" (Charlie Parker) – 10:56
 "If You Could See Me Now" (Tadd Dameron, Carl Sigman) – 5:04
 "Sometimes I'm Happy" (Vincent Youmans, Irving Caesar) – 3:20 	
 "Giant Steps" (John Coltrane) – 5:27
 "April/April Too" (Lennie Tristano/John Eckert) – 4:48
 "Who You" (Jimmy Knepper) – 7:25
 "Stryker's Dues" (Sievert) – 5:00
 "Fourth Dimension" – 3:42
 "Struttin' with Some Barbecue" (Lil Hardin Armstrong, Don Raye) – 4:44
 "Hymn Too" – 0:55
 Jazzspeak: Lee Konitz's Verbal History of the Nonet – 9:35 Bonus track on CD reissue

Personnel 
Lee Konitz – alto saxophone, arranger
Burt Collins – trumpet, flugelhorn, piccolo trumpet
John Eckert – flugelhorn
Jimmy Knepper – trombone
Sam Burtis – bass trombone, tuba
Ronnie Cuber – baritone saxophone
Ben Aronov  – piano
Knobby Totah – bass
Kenny Washington – drums
Sy Johnson – arranger

References 

Lee Konitz albums
1977 albums
Chiaroscuro Records albums